Bibliothek der Sachgeschichten (Library of Factual Stories) is a long-running German news series, broadcast since 1992.

See also
Die Sendung mit der Maus
List of German television series

References

External links
 

German educational television series
2000s German television series
2010s German television series
1992 German television series debuts
German-language television shows
Das Erste original programming